Flight 360: The Takeoff is the second and final studio album by American hip hop duo Playaz Circle. It was released on June 23, 2009, on Disturbing tha Peace/Def Jam Recordings. Recording sessions took place at DB Studios in College Park, at Upstairs Studio in Atlanta, at KY Recordings, at Trak Meet Studios in St. Louis, at Milk Money Consulting, and at Solitaire Studios. Production was handled by Big Hurt, Wonder Arillo, Aktual, Brandon Casey, Brian Casey, Clarence "Kage" Holmes, Crank King, Kidz With Machine Gunz, Korleone, Larry Love, LT Moe, T-Gunnz, The Royalty, The Trak Starz, Tombstone, and Trouble Styles, with Chaka Zulu, Jeff Dixon and Ludacris serving as executive producers. It features guest appearances from Brandon Casey, Brian Casey, Bobby Valentino, CeeLo Green, Lil Wayne, Ludacris, OJ Da Juiceman, Raekwon, Sunni Patterson, Young Dro, Ivory Weems, Dunlap Exclusive and Jay Rush.

The first official single from the album was "Stupid", released on iTunes. There are also music videos for the songs "Look What I Got", "Yeah We Gettin' Rich" featuring Ludacris, "Can't Remember" featuring Bobby V and the remix to "Big Dawg" featuring Lil' Wayne.

The album debuted at number 74 on the Billboard 200, number 11 on the Top R&B/Hip-Hop Albums and number 7 on the Top Rap Albums in the US. The song "Can't Remember" was a mild success reaching No. 85 on the Hot R&B/Hip-Hop Songs.

Track listing

Charts

References

External links

2009 albums
Playaz Circle albums
Def Jam Recordings albums
Disturbing tha Peace albums